Yusof bin Abdullah (8 May 1922 – 27 April 2000) was a Malaysian politician. He was a member of the Parliament of Malaysia and from 1982 to 1989, he served as President of the Pan-Malaysian Islamic Party (PAS). His legal name was Yusof Abdullah.

Early career
Yusof joined PAS in 1951, and notably unseated future Prime Minister Mahathir Mohamad from the seat of Kota Setar Selatan in the 1969 election. Yusof was appointed as a Deputy Minister while PAS was a member of the governing Barisan Nasional coalition in the 1970s, and also served as Malaysia's Ambassador to Afghanistan, Turkey and Iran. He also served as Malaysian delegate to the United Nations.

President of PAS
Yusof became the President of PAS in 1982, winning the post uncontested after a leadership crisis in the party. His election was seen as a victory for the ulama faction of the party as his predecessor, Asri Muda, was considered not an alim. Asri's leadership was notable for the shifting of PAS's outlook towards Malay nationalism. Both joining the Barisan Nasional coalition and moving away from religious-based policy platforms caused the party to lose support.

Yusof subsequently attempted to increase the influence of the ulama within PAS, surrounding himself with ulama leaders such as Nik Abdul Aziz Nik Mat and Abdul Hadi Awang. The direction of his leadership of the party was seen as firmly Islamist: under his presidency, the party adopted an Islamic State as official policy, and proposed to limit the powers of Parliament to be subject to the oversight of an "Ulama Assembly". At the same time, he steered the party away from Malay nationalism and introduced significant changes to the party's internal structure. One change was to introduce the position of "Spiritual Leader", of which he was the first occupant. His leadership style has been described as "fiery and outspoken". He resigned in 1989 citing health reasons, and was replaced by his deputy Fadzil Noor, who set the party on a more moderate path.

Personal life
Yusof died in Penang on 28 April 2000. His son, Mujahid Yusof Rawa, became a member of parliament in 2008 and a Minister in the Prime Minister's Department for Religious Affairs in 2018.

Election results

References

Malaysian Muslims
People from Penang
Members of the Dewan Rakyat
Malaysian people of Malay descent
Presidents of Malaysian Islamic Party
1922 births
Ambassadors of Malaysia to Afghanistan
2000 deaths
Ambassadors of Malaysia to Turkey
Malaysian people of Minangkabau descent
Ambassadors of Malaysia to Iran